David Ceglar (born 14 June 1966) is a former Australian rules footballer who played in the Victorian Football League during the 1980s.  He played 7 games for North Melbourne between 1986 and 1987. He was recruited from Wodonga.

His son John Ceglar is currently on the Geelong playing squad after spending two years on the  rookie list. and eight years at hawthorn

References

External links

Living people
1966 births
Australian rules footballers from Victoria (Australia)
North Melbourne Football Club players
Wodonga Football Club players